The  is a railway line of the Japanese private railway company Kintetsu Railway, connecting Ise-Wakamatsu Station (Suzuka, Mie) and Hiratachō Station (Suzuka, Mie Prefecture) in Japan.

The line connects with the Nagoya Line at Ise-Wakamatsu Station.

Students and factory workers make up the majority of the line's ridership and trains are generally only crowded during rush hour.

History

Kambe Line
The Suzuka Line was originally built by Ise Electric Railway (Iseden) in the 1920s and was known as the ) and for many years the track ended at Ise-Kambe Station (what is now Suzukashi Station).  Steam locomotives were used on the line for its first two years of operation but were soon replaced when the line was electrified in 1927.  Though the line was built by Iseden, ownership of the Kambe Line was passed between various railway companies during the late 1930s and early 1940s due to many mergers occurring within the Japanese private railway industry at that time.  It came under the ownership of Kintetsu in 1944.

Kintetsu made some improvements to the line in the late 1950s and 1960s. A few years later, the line was extended, two new stations were built, and Hiratachō Station became the new terminus. It was at this time that the line received its current name.

Timeline
December 20, 1925 - Ise Railway (Iseden) opens the line as the Iseden Kambe Line (Ise-Wakamatsu ~ Ise-Kambe).
December 26, 1927 - Electrification of the entire line completed.
September 15, 1936 - Sangū Express Electric Railway (Sankyū) acquires Iseden and all of its lines. Line is officially renamed Ise Kambe Line.
March 15, 1941 - Osaka Electric Railroad (Daiki) and Sankyū merge to form Kansai Express Railway (Kankyū).  Line officially renamed Kambe Line.
June 1, 1944 - Kankyū changes its name to Kinki Nippon Railway (Kintetsu). Line officially renamed Kintetsu Kambe Line.
November 23, 1959 - Gauge along entire line widened from 1067 mm to 1435 mm.
April 8, 1963 - Ise-Kambe ~ Hiratachō extension opens.  Ise-Kambe Station officially renamed Suzukashi Station.  Line officially renamed Kintetsu Suzuka Line.
October 17, 1968 - ATS system activated on entire line.
June 13, 1998 - One man (conductor-less) train service begins.

Service
 LO  Local
 For 
 For 
(Locals stop at every station.)
(Trains run twice per hour during the day, four times per hour in the mornings and evenings.)

 EX  Express
 For 
 For 
(Stops at every station on the Suzuka Line.)
(Trains run once a day in the morning on weekdays.)

Stations

References
 Kintetsu Line Archives - Suzuka Line

External links
 Kintetsu railway network map - Suzuka Line
 Main Terminal - Kintetsu Suzuka Line 

Suzuka Line
Rail transport in Mie Prefecture
Standard gauge railways in Japan
Railway lines opened in 1925
1925 establishments in Japan